The 1989 McDonald's All-American Boys Game was an All-star basketball game played on Sunday, April 23, 1989 at Kemper Arena in Kansas City, Missouri. The game's rosters featured the best and most highly recruited high school boys graduating in 1989. The game was the 12th annual version of the McDonald's All-American Game first played in 1978.

1989 game
The game was telecast live by ABC. The West was led by Shaquille O'Neal, the top ranked center of his class, while the East had forward Doug Edwards and guard Bobby Hurley. Guard Kenny Anderson was unable to participate due to a sprained left ankle. The game saw O'Neal record a double-double with 18 points and 16 rebounds; he also had 6 blocks. Hurley recorded 10 assists, the highest number of assists recorded in a McDonald's game up to that point, and won co-MVP along with O'Neal. Other good performances were those of Billy McCaffrey (16 points), George Lynch (12), Allan Houston (14) and Tracy Murray (14). Of the 25 players, 13 went on to play at least 1 game in the NBA.

East roster

West roster

Coaches
The East team was coached by:
 Head Coach Walter Van Huss of Dobyns-Bennett High School (Kingsport, Tennessee)

The West team was coached by:
 Head Coach Tom Orlich of South Tahoe High School (Lake Tahoe, California)

All-American Week

Contest winners 
 The 1989 Slam Dunk contest was won by James Robinson.
 The 1989 3-point shoot-out was won by Pat Graham.

References

External links
McDonald's All-American on the web
McDonald's All-American all-time rosters
McDonald's All-American rosters at Basketball-Reference.com
Game stats at Realgm.com

1988–89 in American basketball
1989
1989 in sports in Missouri
Basketball competitions in Kansas City, Missouri